Olugbenga Ashiru (27 August 1948 – 29 November 2014) was Foreign Minister of Nigeria from 2011 to 2013. A graduate of the University of Lagos and career diplomat, he had previously served as Ambassador to South Korea, and High Commissioner to South Africa. He died in South Africa in November 2014 aged 66.

References

1948 births
2014 deaths
Foreign ministers of Nigeria
Ambassadors of Nigeria to South Korea
High Commissioners of Nigeria to South Africa
Nigerian diplomats
University of Lagos alumni
Yoruba people